The 2018 Italian Basketball Supercup, also known as Zurich Connect Supercoppa 2018 for sponsorship reasons, was the 24th edition of the super cup tournament, organized by the Lega Basket Serie A (LBA).

AX Armani Exchange Milano were the defending champions.

AX Armani Exchange Milano went to win his 3rd Supercup by beating Fiat Torino 82–71 in the Finals. Vladimir Micov was named MVP of the competition.

It was played in the PalaLeonessa in Brescia on 29 and 30 September 2018.

Participant teams
As of 3 June 2018, qualified for the tournament were Fiat Torino and Germani Brescia, as Italian Cup finalists, AX Armani Exchange Milano and Dolomiti Energia Trento as LBA Playoffs finalist.

Bracket

Semifinals

Fiat Torino vs. Dolomiti Energia Trento

AX Armani Exchange Milano vs. Germani Basket Brescia

Final

Fiat Torino vs. AX Armani Exchange Milano

Sponsors

References

External links
 LBA Supercoppa official website

Italian Basketball Cup
2017–18 in Italian basketball
2018–19 in Italian basketball